Mother Superior were an American hard rock band based in Los Angeles, California, active 1993–2011. A power trio, they originally consisted of guitarist/vocalist Jim Wilson, bassist Marcus Blake and drummer Jason Mackenroth. Mother Superior released eight studio albums.

History 
Wilson, Blake and Mackenroth backed vocalist Henry Rollins for three studio albums as the final lineup of Rollins Band from 1997 to 2003. In 2005, Mackenroth quit and was replaced by Matt Tecu. Mackenroth died on January 3, 2016, in Nevada from prostate cancer complications.

In addition to playing live with the Rollins Band and U2 producer Daniel Lanois, Mother Superior (as a group or its members individually) have done session work with Daniel Lanois, Tony Visconti, Alice Cooper, Meat Loaf, Emmylou Harris, Sparks, Anthrax, Wayne Kramer, Lemmy, George Clinton, Iggy Pop, Mike Patton, Dig, and Queens of the Stone Age.

Motor Sister
A few years after Mother Superior disbanded, vocalist Pearl Aday reached out to Wilson as a gift for her husband, guitarist Scott Ian of Anthrax. A longtime Mother Superior fan, Ian wanted to play some of his favorite Mother Superior songs with Wilson. Aday, Ian and Wilson were joined by bassist Joey Vera (Fates Warning, Armored Saint) and drummer John Tempesta (The Cult, Exodus, Testament, and  White Zombie). This led to the group re-recording twelve of the songs and releasing them in 2015 under the name Motor Sister.

Discography
Studio albums
{| class="wikitable"
|-
|Year
|Title
|Label 
|Notes
|-
|1993
|Right in a Row 
|Self Produced
|An eight-song recording/demo
|-
|1996
|The Heavy Soul Experience 
|Top Beat Records
|Self-released
|-
|1997
|Kaleidescope 
|Top Beat Records
|Self-released
|-
|1998
|Deep 
|Top Beat Records
|Japanese version 1999 - Crown Records
|-
|2001
|Mother Superior 
|Triple X Records
|
|-
|2002
|Sin
|Muscletone Records
|European version 2003 - Fargo Records
|-
|2004
|13 Violets
|Top Beat Records
|European version 2004 - Fargo Records
|-
|2005
|Moanin'''
|Bad Reputation
|(Matt Tecu joins on drums) Release in Europe
|-
|2007
|Three Headed Dog|Rosa Records 
|Release in Europe
|-
|2008
|Grande|Kickin' Records 
|Release in Europe 
|}

Live albumsLive at The Whisky'' (1998 - Top Beat Records)

References

External links
 Motor Sister at Metal Blade Records

Hard rock musical groups from California
American blues rock musical groups
Musical groups from Los Angeles